Carate may refer to:

Italian municipalities
 Carate Brianza, in the Province of Monza and Brianza, Lombardy
 Carate Urio, in the Province of Como, Lombard

Other
 Carate, Costa Rica, small touristic town in Costa Rica, in the Osa Peninsula.
 Carate (disease)